Semagystia witti is a moth in the family Cossidae. It was described by Yakovlev in 2007. It is found in Afghanistan.

The length of the forewings is about 12 mm. The marginal zone of the forewings is light grey with small dark spots at the veins at the margin. From the base to the postdiscal area is darker and contains brown-grey areas. The hindwings are grey-brown.

References

Natural History Museum Lepidoptera generic names catalog

Cossinae
Moths described in 2007